Jeremy Faison is a Republican member of the Tennessee House of Representatives for the Eleventh District and is the Chairman of the House Republican Caucus. After being elected by the majority body to the Chairman position, Faison is one of the highest ranking House Leadership members in the legislative body. He represents all of Cocke County and part of Greene County and Jefferson County.

Biography

Jeremy Faison was born on September 14, 1976, in Monroe, Georgia. He was homeschooled elementary through high school grade levels and was issued a high school diploma from Victory Christian Academy (Jacksonville, Florida) in 1995, prior to his attending Clearwater College. Faison and his wife also homeschool all of their own children.

Faison is married with five children. They reside in Cosby, Tennessee. He is a worship leader Crossroads Community Church. He plays several musical instruments. Faison and his wife own a pest and wildlife control business in Newport, Tennessee. He is a past president of the Cocke County Republican Party and member of the Cocke County Chamber of Commerce.

In 2010, he defeated Eddie Yokley to become Tennessee State Representative for the Eleventh District. He is a member of the National Rifle Association and the Tennessee Hunters Association. He has been given a grade of "A" by the National Rifle Association's Political Victory Fund, a group supporting 2nd Amendment Rights in the American political process.

On February 1, 2019, Faison was severely injured in a car crash in Smith County, Tennessee. Faison survived and was taken to the hospital, with a broken nose and cracked ribs; he also received stitches in his head. He acknowledged that he was not wearing a safety belt at the time of the incident. He now is an advocate for regular safety belt use across the state.

On January 4, 2022, Faison was ejected from a high school basketball game after he reportedly threatened to fight the referee, and also attempted to pull his pants down in frustration.

References

Living people
1976 births
Christians from Georgia (U.S. state)
Christians from Tennessee
People from Monroe, Georgia
Republican Party members of the Tennessee House of Representatives
21st-century American politicians
People from Cosby, Tennessee